Şule Şahbaz (born 2 October 1978) is a former Turkish weightlifter who competed in the -75 kg division.

She won a gold medal at the 2002 Weightlifting Championship, silver medals at the 1999 and 2004 European Championships and a bronze medal at the 2003 World Championships.

She was scheduled to compete in the women's 75 kg weight class at the 2004 Summer Olympics, but tested positive for a banned substance ahead of the Olympics and was disqualified.

See also
List of sportspeople sanctioned for doping offences

References

1978 births
Living people
Weightlifters at the 2004 Summer Olympics
Olympic weightlifters of Turkey
Doping cases in weightlifting
Turkish sportspeople in doping cases
Place of birth missing (living people)
Turkish female weightlifters
European champions in weightlifting
European champions for Turkey
Mediterranean Games silver medalists for Turkey
Mediterranean Games medalists in weightlifting
Competitors at the 2001 Mediterranean Games
European Weightlifting Championships medalists
World Weightlifting Championships medalists
20th-century Turkish sportswomen
21st-century Turkish sportswomen